The 1983 Georgia Southern Eagles football team represented the Georgia Southern Eagles of Georgia Southern College (now known as Georgia Southern University) during the 1983 NCAA Division I-AA football season. The Eagles played their home games at Womack Stadium in Statesboro, Georgia.  The team was coached by Erk Russell, in his second year as head coach for the Eagles.

Schedule

References

Georgia Southern
Georgia Southern Eagles football seasons
Georgia Southern Eagles football